Jack Regan was an Australian rules footballer.

Jack Regan may also refer to:

Jack Regan (hurler) (born 1995), Irish hurler
Jack Regan (American football) (?–2015), American football coach
Jack Regan (rugby union) (born 1997), Irish rugby union player
Jack Regan (The Sweeney)

See also
Jack Reagan (1883–1941), father of Ronald Reagan
John Regan (disambiguation)